The 2004–05 Ohio State Buckeyes men's basketball team represented Ohio State University in the 2004–05 NCAA Division I men's basketball season. They were led by their first-year head coach, Thad Matta, and played their home game at the Value City Arena, in Columbus, Ohio as members of the Big Ten Conference. The Buckeyes finished the season 20-12, 8-8 in Big Ten play. They the 6th seed in the Big Ten tournament. They defeated Penn State in the first round before losing to Wisconsin in the quarterfinals. They were not given a bid for the NCAA tournament. The highlight of the season was beating Number 1 Illinois at home to give them their only loss of the regular season.

Previous season 
The Buckeyes finished the 2003-04 season 14-16, 6-10 in Big Ten play to finish in ninth place. They were defeated by Indiana in the first round of the Big Ten tournament

Roster

References 

Ohio State Buckeyes
Ohio State Buckeyes seasons